New Zealand–Vietnam relations refers to the relations between New Zealand and Vietnam. New Zealand has an embassy in Hanoi and a consulate-general in Ho Chi Minh City. Vietnam has an embassy in Wellington.

History  
Diplomatic ties were established in 1975, with New Zealand being one of the first nations to establish diplomatic ties with the newly unified Vietnam. New Zealand and Vietnam established Comprehensive Partnership in 2008. Since then, there have been a growth in political exchanges, bilateral trade and education links. The two nations celebrated their 40th anniversary of diplomatic relations in 2015. Direct flights between the two nations started in 2016.

Vietnam War and aftermath

New Zealand participated in the Vietnam War. The country sent 3000 military and civilian personnel.

Official visits 

In 2013, Vietnamese Minister of Defense General Phung Quang Thanh traveled to New Zealand and met with Defense Minister Jonathan Coleman, and Minister of Foreign Affairs Murray McCully. In November 2016, Deputy Prime Minister Pham Binh Minh visited New Zealand and met with Murray McCully as well as Prime Minister Bill English. In May 2017, New Zealand Minister of Trade Todd McClay visited Vietnam and met Prime Minister Nguyen Xuan Phuc and Minister of Industry and Trade Tran Tuan Anh.

Trade 

As of November 2015, Vietnam was New Zealand's fastest-growing export market and its 19th largest export market; this led to agreements on aviation, healthcare and education being made between the two nations. Earlier that year, a goal was set by both countries to double trade between the two of them, as both countries were set on signing the Trans-Pacific Partnership amidst criticism.

Migration
New Zealand also has a relatively small Vietnamese community of around 6,000 people, which consists of refugees and their families, economic migrants, and students.

See also
 Vietnamese New Zealanders

References 

 
Vietnam
Bilateral relations of Vietnam